The Raytheon AN/MSQ-18 Battalion Missile Operations System (AN/TSQ-38 for the helicopter-transportable variant) was a Project Nike command, control, and coordination system for "each associated missile battery" to control a Nike missile as directed from a Raytheon AN/MSQ-28 at the Army Air Defense Command Post.   Raytheon Company constructed the AN/MSQ-18 as 2 separate subsystems:
the AN/MSQ-18's operations central in a trailer van with 2 "Surveillance and Entry Consoles"USAREUR Partial Photos - 2-56th Arty and serving as "the tactical command post of the air defense battalion … capable of either monitoring the engagement or actually making assignments of targets to its batteries", and 
the AN/MSQ-18's coder-decoder group (CDG) as the trailer van at each battery to "decode the digital data coming to the battery [for use] by the guided missile system."

References 

Cold War military computer systems of the United States
AN MSQ-18
Project Nike
United States Army equipment